Fred McKinnon (born 1960s) is an American former basketball player. He is known for being the Big South Conference's first ever Men's Basketball Player of the Year in 1985–86.

McKinnon, a 6'6" forward from Crystal River, Florida, played one year of junior college basketball at Florida College before transferring to Winthrop University in 1983. In his senior year in 1985–86, McKinnon averaged 21.1 points per game to lead all Big South players.

Through the 2012–13 season, McKinnon holds the Big South Conference record for field goals made in a game with 20. He is also tied for second for most field goal attempts in a single game with 31. For his career, McKinnon finished with 1,427 points.

References

1960s births
Living people
Basketball players from Florida
Forwards (basketball)
Junior college men's basketball players in the United States
People from Crystal River, Florida
Winthrop Eagles men's basketball players
American men's basketball players